State Highway 16 (SH 16) is  east–west state highway in El Paso County, Colorado, United States, that connects Interstate 25/U.S. Route 87 (I-25/US 87) on the border of Fort Carson and Fountain with Colorado State Highway 21 (SH 21) in Fountain. SH 16 constitutes the westernmost portion of a longer road known as the Mesa Ridge Parkway.

Route description

SH 16 is a four-lane expressway for its entire length. It begins at an interchange with I-25/US 87 (Exit 132). (McGrath Avenue heads west from the interchange through Fort Carson.) From its western terminus SH 16 heads east with a 45 mph speed limit. After briefly leaving the city limits of Fountain, the highway crosses over Fountain Creek.

Just after re-entering Fountain, SH 16 passes over the CanAm Highway/North Santa Fe Avenue (U.S. Route 85), forming a partial cloverleaf interchange. (US 85 heads north through Security-Widefield and Stratmoor before merging with I-25/US 87. US 85 heads south to also merge with I-25/US 87.)

After the interchange with US 85, the speed limit increases to 55 mph and the route makes a southeast trajectory through neighborhoods in northern Fountain. SH 16 then turns to the northeast and reaches its eastern terminus at an intersection with the southern end of SH 21 (Powers Boulevard) at a T intersection. (From the eastern terminus Mesa Ridge Parkway continues east and SH 21 heads north through Security-Widefield and into Colorado Springs to end at U.S. Route 24.).

History
The route was established in 1970 and the first mile was constructed from I-25 east to US 85 (CanAm Highway). It was gradually extended in 2007 from CanAm Highway/Santa Fe Avenue to Powers Boulevard, when Mesa Ridge Parkway was added to the route, and the route length almost tripled.

Major intersections

See also

 List of state highways in Colorado

References

External links

 Colorado Routes, Highway 16

Transportation in El Paso County, Colorado
016
Expressways in the United States